Borisovsky is a rural locality (a khutor) in Staroanninskoye Rural Settlement, Novoanninsky District, Volgograd Oblast, Russia. The population was 137 as of 2010.

Geography 
Borisovsky is located near Malyye and Bolshiye Yaryzhki Lakes, 20 km southwest of Novoanninsky (the district's administrative centre) by road. Pereshchepnovsky is the nearest rural locality.

References 

Rural localities in Novoanninsky District